Antonio Cid Cortés (born 16 February 1954 in Ourense) is a boccia player from Spain.  He has a physical disability: he has cerebral palsy and is a BC1 type athlete.  He competed at the 1996 Summer Paralympics.  He finished first in the BC1/BC2 team event.  He competed at the 2000 Summer Paralympics. He finished second in the BC1 one person event and in the BC1/BC2 team event. He competed at the 2004 Summer Paralympics.

Notes

References

External links 
 
 

1954 births
Living people
Spanish boccia players
Paralympic boccia players of Spain
Paralympic gold medalists for Spain
Paralympic silver medalists for Spain
Paralympic bronze medalists for Spain
Paralympic medalists in boccia
Boccia players at the 1992 Summer Paralympics
Boccia players at the 1996 Summer Paralympics
Boccia players at the 2000 Summer Paralympics
Boccia players at the 2004 Summer Paralympics
Medalists at the 1992 Summer Paralympics
Medalists at the 1996 Summer Paralympics
Medalists at the 2000 Summer Paralympics
Medalists at the 2004 Summer Paralympics
Sportspeople from Ourense